Austin Franklin (born December 6, 1992) is a former American football wide receiver. He played college football at New Mexico State University, and played for the St. Louis Rams in National Football League (NFL) as an undrafted free agent in 2014. Franklin later played in the Arena Football League (AFL) with the LA Kiss.

Early years
Franklin was a two-sport star at Kimball High School in Dallas, playing football and basketball. He was named the Most Valuable Player of the 4A District 14  Dallas City League for basketball. Franklin was a member and starter of the 2011 4A UIL Basketball State Championship.  During Franklin's football career he played wildcat quarterback, wide receiver, and also returned punts and kick off return.

College career 
Franklin played football for New Mexico State University after being recruited by Utah, Wyoming, Colorado State, New Mexico, Utah State and Vanderbilt. In his sophomore year in 2012, Franklin managed to accumulate 74 catches for 1,245 yards and was also first team all WAC selection. He was one of ten to be nominated as a Semifinalists for the 2012 Bilentnikoff Award. Franklin was also named an SI.com Honorable Mention All-American and became the 13th Aggie to earn All-American Honors. After sitting out 4 games due to grades he still managed 52 receptions for 670 receiving yards. Over his career he managed 160 receptions, 2,439 receiving yards and 19 touchdowns averaging 15.2 yards a carry. Franklin decided to skip his senior year in order to declare for the 2014 NFL Draft.

Professional career

References

1992 births
Living people
American football wide receivers
African-American players of American football
New Mexico State Aggies football players
Los Angeles Kiss players
Players of American football from Dallas
Wichita Falls Nighthawks players